Robbie Mutch (born 20 August 1998, in Elgin, Scotland) is a Scottish footballer who plays as a goalkeeper for Scottish League One side Edinburgh.

Career
Mutch came through Aberdeen's youth system, and joined Scottish League Two side Arbroath on loan in June 2016. After leaving the Dons he joined Scottish Championship side Falkirk in the summer of 2017. He won the club's Young Player of the Year Award in his first season, and signed a new three-year deal in May 2018. Mutch joined Scottish League One side Dumbarton on a short-term loan as cover for the injured Grant Adam in October 2018. He returned to Falkirk a fortnight later to cover for the suspended Leo Fasan. In January 2019, Mutch joined Scottish Highland Football League side Deveronvale on loan for the remainder of the 2018/19 campaign following an injury to Vale's regular goalkeeper Grant Pennet. Mutch returned to Falkirk in pre season of the 2019/20 season and started the season as back-up to Cammy Bell. During the season he took the number one spot at Falkirk and, in January 2020 despite interest from English Premier League side Southampton he signed a contract extension taking it up to the summer of 2022.

Mutch left Falkirk after the 2021–22 season ended and then signed for Edinburgh in July 2022.

References

External links

1998 births
Living people
Scottish footballers
Association football goalkeepers
Falkirk F.C. players
Arbroath F.C. players
Aberdeen F.C. players
Dumbarton F.C. players
Scottish Professional Football League players
Deveronvale F.C. players
F.C. Edinburgh players